Hessenberg may refer to:

People:
Gerhard Hessenberg (1874–1925), German mathematician
Karl Hessenberg (1904–1959), German mathematician and engineer
Kurt Hessenberg (1908–1994), German composer and professor at the Hochschule für Musik und Darstellende Kunst in Frankfurt am Main

Mathematics:
Hessenberg matrix, one that is "almost" triangular
Hessenberg variety, a family of subvarieties of the full flag variety which are defined by a Hessenberg function h and a linear transformation X